Bloody Tie (lit. "A Life-or-Death Decision") is a 2006 South Korean action crime film directed by Choi Ho, it stars Hwang Jung-min as a detective trying to track down a drug lord by cooperating with a mid-level drug dealer, played by Ryoo Seung-bum.

Plot
Sang-do (Ryoo Seung-bum) is a fast talking crystal meth dealer who considers himself more of a businessman than a criminal. Sang-do has been involved in the drug business all of his life. His uncle was a drug dealer (Kim Hee-ra), specializing in manufacturing crystal meth. Sang-do's mother died when one of his uncle’s meth labs blew up in an accident.

Do Jin-kwang (Hwang Jung-min) is a hard-nosed cop who doesn't always play by the rules. Do's partner died four years ago, while trying to take down the top drug dealer Jang Chul (Lee Do-kyeong) in Busan. Since his partner's death, Do has been driven to arrest Jang Chul and this time he plans to use Sang-do to finally take him down.

Cast
Ryoo Seung-bum - Oh Sang-do
Hwang Jung-min - Do Jin-kwang
Kim Hee-ra - Lee Taek-jo
Choo Ja-hyun - Ji-young
Lee Do-kyeong - Jang Chul
On Joo-wan - Yoo Sung-geun
Kim Jin-hyeok - Young-nam
Jung Woo - Detective Kim
Lee Eol - Detective Kim
Shin Jung-geun - Section chief Go
Yang Ki-won - Hyung-nam
Kim Sun-hwa - Hyung-nam's girl
Min Do-gi 
Choi Jin-ho - Chang-joon

Awards and nominations
2006 Busan Film Critics Awards
 Best Actor - Hwang Jung-min
 Best Supporting Actress - Choo Ja-hyun

2006 Grand Bell Awards
 Best New Actress - Choo Ja-hyun
 Nomination - Best Actor - Ryoo Seung-bum
 Nomination - Best Editing - Kim Sang-bum, Kim Jae-bum

2006 Blue Dragon Film Awards
 Nomination - Best New Actress - Choo Ja-hyun
 Nomination - Best Cinematography - Oh Hyun-je
 Nomination - Best Lighting - Im Jae-young
 Nomination - Best Music - Kim Sang-man

2006 Korean Film Awards
 Best Supporting Actress - Choo Ja-hyun
 Best New Actress - Choo Ja-hyun
 Nomination - Best Actor - Ryoo Seung-bum
 Nomination - Best Actor - Hwang Jung-min
 Nomination - Best Cinematography - Oh Hyun-je
 Nomination - Best Editing - Kim Sang-bum, Kim Jae-bum

2006 Director's Cut Awards
 Best New Actress - Choo Ja-hyun

2007 Baeksang Arts Awards
 Best Actor - Ryoo Seung-bum
 Nomination - Best New Actress - Choo Ja-hyun

References

External links
  
 
 
 

2006 films
2006 crime thriller films
2000s crime action films
South Korean crime thriller films
Police detective films
Films about drugs
South Korean crime action films
South Korean neo-noir films
Films set in Busan
2000s Korean-language films
Films directed by Choi Ho
2000s South Korean films
Myung Films films